King George County is a county located in the Commonwealth of Virginia. As of the 2020 census, the population sits at 26,723. Its county seat is the town of King George.

The county's largest employer is the U.S. Naval Surface Warfare Center Dahlgren Division. It is adjacent to the two-lane,  Harry W. Nice Memorial Bridge carrying U.S. Highway 301 over the Potomac River.
It contains the ZIP codes 22448 (Dahlgren) and 22485 (all other areas within King George).  It is within the area code 540 and contains the exchanges: 775, 644, 663, and 653.

History
Indigenous peoples of varying cultures lived along the waterways for thousands of years before Europeans arrived.  Among the historic Native American tribes who came into conflict with the English were the Algonquian-speaking Nanzatico. In 1704 colonists retaliated for the tribe's attacking the farm of John Rowley, "known for his disputes" with them. The colonists captured and shipped 40 Nanzatico to Antigua in the Caribbean, where they were sold into slavery; this number included children older than 12.

King George County was established in 1720 when land was split from Richmond County, Virginia. The county is named for King George I of Great Britain. It was substantially reorganized in 1776 and 1777, with land swapped with both Stafford and Westmoreland counties to form the modern boundaries.

In the early decades, planters cultivated tobacco, a labor-intensive commodity crop, depending on the labor of both indentured servants from Britain and enslaved Africans. Gradually slaves became the primary laborers, as fewer indentured servants arrived and the landowners were too lazy. Later mixed crops were introduced, as the land had gotten exhausted from tobacco cultivation. The county and state were dominated by slavery.

On March 16, 1751, James Madison, the fourth President of the United States, was born at Belle Grove plantation, the childhood home of his mother, Eleanor Rose "Nellie" Conway. Like other women, she returned home to her mother for assistance when bearing her child. The plantation is located in Port Conway in southern King George County. Nellie Conway was the daughter of its owner, Francis Conway, for whom the town of Port Conway was named. William "Extra Billy" Smith, twice elected governor of Virginia, was born at Marengo, Virginia in 1797.

On May 1, 1861, during the American Civil War, Confederates installed artillery at Mathias Point in order to blockade the Potomac River. On June 27, the steamer Thomas Freeborn bombarded Mathias Point in an effort to drive away the soldiers who were manning the weapons. Confederate soldiers fired back from Mathias Point, striking and mortally wounding Commander James H. Ward of the Freeborn. He was the first Union naval officer to die in the Civil War.

After assassinating President Abraham Lincoln, John Wilkes Booth and David Herold tried to elude Union cavalry, and crossed into the Virginia county by boat from Maryland on April 21, 1865. Booth and Herold landed at the mouth of Gambo Creek, before meeting with Confederate agents, who guided their passage to Port Conway. From there they crossed into Port Royal, in Caroline County.

Geography

King George County is located on the Northern Neck and is bounded on the north by the Potomac River, which lies in Charles County, Maryland. It is bounded on the south by the Rappahannock River, across which lie Caroline and Essex counties; on the east by Westmoreland County and on the west by Stafford County, all in Virginia.

National protected area
 Rappahannock River Valley National Wildlife Refuge (part)- Bishop, Styer, and Toby's Point units

Major highways

Demographics

2020 census

Note: the US Census treats Hispanic/Latino as an ethnic category. This table excludes Latinos from the racial categories and assigns them to a separate category. Hispanics/Latinos can be of any race.

2010 census
As of the census of 2010, there were 23,584 people, 9,411 households, and 4,525 families residing in the county. The population density was 93 people per square mile (36/km2). There were 6,820 housing units at an average density of 38 per square mile (15/km2). The racial makeup of the county was 76.7% White, 17.9% Black or African American, 0.5% Native American, 1.2% Asian, 0.1% Pacific Islander, 0.8% from other races, and 2.9% from two or more races. 3.3% of the population were Hispanic or Latino of any race.

There were 6,091 households, out of which 38.00% had children under the age of 18 living with them, 59.50% were married couples living together, 10.50% had a female householder with no husband present, and 25.70% were non-families. 20.40% of all households were made up of individuals, and 6.00% had someone living alone who was 65 years of age or older. The average household size was 2.70 and the average family size was 3.12.

In the county, the population was spread out, with 27.80% under the age of 18, 8.20% from 18 to 24, 31.70% from 25 to 44, 22.70% from 45 to 64, and 9.60% who were 65 years of age or older. The median age was 35 years. For every 100 females, there were 101.00 males. For every 100 females age 18 and over, there were 99.40 males.

The median income for a household in the county was $49,882, and the median income for a family was $55,160. Males had a median income of $38,600 versus $26,350 for females. The per capita income for the county was $21,562. About 4.40% of families and 5.60% of the population were below the poverty line, including 6.10% of those under age 18 and 6.40% of those age 65 or over.

Government

Board of Supervisors
 County Administrator: Christopher Miller
 Member/Chair (At Large): Ann C Cupka
 Member (Shiloh): Cathy Binder
 Member (Madison): Richard Granger 
 Member (Monroe): Jeffery L. Bueche
 Member/Vice Chair (Dahlgren): Jeff Stonehill

Constitutional officers
 Clerk of the Circuit Court: Charles V. "Vic" Mason (I)
 Commissioner of the Revenue: Judy Hart (I)
 Commonwealth's Attorney: Keri A. Gusmann (I)
 Sheriff: Christopher A Giles(I)
 Treasurer: Randy Jones (I)

King George is represented by Republicans Ryan T. McDougle and Richard H. Stuart in the Virginia Senate, Republican Margaret Ransone in the Virginia House of Delegates, and Republican Rob Wittman in the U.S. House of Representatives.

Festivals
The King George Fall Festival is held the second weekend of October in King George. All proceeds from this event go to support the Volunteer King George Fire & Rescue.

The Fall Festival also includes a parade through town, a carnival, a craft fair, a car show, a dance, a 5-K run, and the Fall Festival Queens Pageant. The King George Fall Festival began in October 1959.

Communities

Census-designated places
 Dahlgren
 Dahlgren Center
 Fairview Beach
 King George
 Passapatanzy

Other unincorporated communities

 Berthaville
 Dogue
 Hampstead
 Jersey
 Ninde
 Owens
 Port Conway
 Rollins Fork
 Sealston
 Shiloh
 Weedonville

Education
King George County Schools serves all parts of the county for grades PK-12, except for those within Naval Surface Warfare Center Dahlgren Division, which are served by the Department of Defense Education Activity (DoDEA). The DoDEA property has a single PreK-8 school, Dahlgren Elementary Middle School.

Notable residents
 James Madison, fourth President of the United States
 Mark Warner, US Senator, maintains a residence and farm
 Krystal Ball, political talk show co-host and one-time Congressional candidate, grew up in King George
 Collette Wolfe, actress, grew up in King George, Virginia
 Jermon Bushrod, tackle for the New Orleans Saints in the National Football League (NFL), grew up in King George, Virginia
 Al Bumbry, Major League Baseball Player
 Nell Zink, American novelist, grew up in King George County
 Dorthia Cottrell, musician, grew up in King George County
 Philip Scholz, author and former Paralympic swimmer.

See also
 Caledon State Park
 National Register of Historic Places listings in King George County, Virginia
 Northern Neck George Washington Birthplace AVA

References

External links

 King George County Administration
 King George County Public Schools
 King George County Historical Society
 RootsWeb King George County
 King George County Online GIS

 
Virginia counties
Virginia counties on the Potomac River
Northern Neck
1720 establishments in Virginia
Populated places established in 1720